4'-Fluoro-α-pyrrolidinooctanophenone (also known as 4-Fluoro-PV-9, FPOP and 4-Fluoro-α-POP) is a stimulant drug of the cathinone class which has been reported as a novel designer drug.

Legality
4-F-α-POP is illegal in Japan.

See also 
 α-PBP
 α-PHP
 α-PPP
 α-PVP
 4F-PVP
 4F-PHP
 Prolintane

References 

Designer drugs
Fluoroarenes
Pyrrolidinophenones
Norepinephrine–dopamine reuptake inhibitors
Stimulants